John Compton (1876–1957), born in Newton Burgoland, Leicestershire was a pipe organ builder. His business based in Nottingham and London  flourished between 1902 and 1965.

Life
John Compton was educated at King Edward's School, Birmingham and then studied as an apprentice with Halmshaw & Sons in Birmingham. In 1898 he joined Brindley and Foster in Sheffield. Then he joined Charles Lloyd in Nottingham.

He set up the business Musson & Compton in 1902 in Nottingham with James Frederick Musson. The partnership dissolved in 1904. In 1919, the business moved to workshops at Turnham Green Terrace, Chiswick, London, which had been vacated by August Gern. He occupied a new factory at Chase Road, Park Royal, North Acton, London in 1930.

Compton worked primarily on electric-action pipe organs and electronic organs.  Compton's first electronic instrument was the Melotone (a solo voice added to theatre organs); next came the Theatrone. The Electrone, an electrostatic  tonewheel instrument introduced in 1938, evolved out of research by Leslie Bourn, an association begun in the 1920s. Throughout his organ-building career, John Compton was assisted by the very capable and inventive James Isaac Taylor, who spent his entire working life with the Compton firm prior to his death in 1958. John Compton also befriended a wealthy industrialist by the name of Albert Henry Midgley; one of the founders of C A Vandervell, which was later to become CAV-Lucas Ltd; a major supplier of electrical equipment to the motor industry. Midgley was one of the most prolific inventors of his age, with over 900 inventions to his name and following a rift with C A V-Lucas,he was appointed Technical Director of the Compton firm soon after, in 1925. Midgley's genius in electrical engineering and mass-production techniques, helped the Compton firm to achieve an extraordinary level of productivity.  The company were awarded many original patents in things ranging from simple organ mechanisms to the most complex, state of the art electronic and electrical inventions. Many of those patents show that Midgley was cited as the inventor.

On 13 June 1940, during World War II, Compton was arrested while holidaying on the island of Capri, in Italy. He was interned as an enemy alien but spent much of his time restoring pipe organs, before being permitted to return to England.

Compton died in 1957, and the business continued under the direction of his right-hand man, James I Taylor. Taylor died the year after in 1958, and the business was wound up around 1965. The pipe organ department was sold to Rushworth and Dreaper; the electronic department became Makin Organs.

Compton organs

Compton cinema organs, built by the John Compton Organ Company of Acton, were the most prevalent of theatre organs in the UK; 261 were installed in cinemas and theatres in the British Isles. Comptons made many fine church and concert organs as well. Their cinema organs employed the latest technology and engineering and many are still in existence today. One of the most notable is the large 5 manual example at the Odeon Cinema Leicester Square in central London.

List of new organs

All Souls' Church, Radford 1903
Emmanuel Church, Nottingham 1903
United Methodist Free Church, Stapleford 1903
Church of St. Mary Magdalene, Hucknall 1903
Emmanuel Church, New Park St, Leicester 1905
St Wilfrid's Church, Cantley 1905
Selby Abbey 1906
St. Peter's School Chapel, York 1907
Launceston Wesleyan Church 1909
Holdenhurst Road Methodist Church, Bournemouth 1909
Westbourne Wesleyan Church, Bournemouth 1910
Shakespeare Street Wesleyan Reform Chapel, Nottingham 1914
Stowmarket Parish Church, 1922
St Swithun's Church, Cheswardine, Shropshire, 1922 memorial for those killed in the 1914-1918 war
Shepherd's Bush Pavilion 1923
Bournemouth Pavilion Theatre 1929
Elite Picture Theatre, Nottingham 1930
Chapel Cranleigh School Surrey 1930. Eight Ranks, Three manuals. Lasted until 1978. Verifiable on NPOR site
Church of St Osmund, Parkstone 1931
Downside Abbey 1931
St. Mary Magdelene's Church, Paddington 1932
Church of St Edmund the King and Martyr, Lombard Street, London 1932
BBC Concert Hall Broadcasting House, London 1932
Broadway Theatre, Catford, 1932:- (contemporaneously, a music hall)
Plaza Cinema, Stockport 1932
St Luke's Church, Chelsea 1932
Odeon Cinema, Weston-super-Mare 1935
St. Benedict's Priory, Ealing 1935
East Church of St Nicholas, Aberdeen 1936
Southampton Guildhall 1936
Regent Street Cinema, London 1936
Odeon Cinema, Leicester Square 1937
Emmanuel United Reformed Church, Worthing 1937 (formerly St Columba's Presbyterian Church)
Wolverhampton Civic Hall 1938
Methodist Mission, Great Yarmouth 1938
St John's Cathedral, Salford 1938
Church House, Westminster 1939
Christchurch Priory 1951
St Eugene's Cathedral, Derry 1956
St Bride's Church London 1957
St George's Cathedral, Southwark 1958
St Alban Golders Green, London 
Westover (now ABC) Cinema, Bournemouth c.1937
Astoria Cinema, Pokesdown c.1930s
(the last two organs are unconfirmed, but their existence is attested to by local documentary sources; the Westover instrument is now in private hands at Ryde on the Isle of Wight; the Astoria instrument no longer exist)

Southern Grammar School for Boys, Portsmouth c. 1957
Portsmouth Guildhall 1959
 St.Alban's Holborn 1961

Rebuilds and restorations
Holy Trinity Church, Hull 1938
Holy Trinity Church, Exmouth 1953
Christ Church Pennington, Leigh - 1953
St Catherine, Bearwood, Wokingham, Berkshire. 1952 (NPOR A00449) 
Tower Hill Methodist Church, Hessle 2001 (Formerly at Oxted United Reformed Church, Surrey)

References

Other sources
Ivor Buckingham, The Compton List: dedicated to the John Compton Organ Company and its products - includes details on Theatrones and Electrones
Penistone Cinema Organ Trust: Compton Organ

External links
Electrokinetica, Introducing the Compton Electrone Includes a thorough technical description. Accessed 29 Oct 2009.
. Includes sound of organ. Accessed 29 Oct 2009.
. Accessed 29 March 2010.
. Accessed 29 March 2010.
. Accessed 29 March 2010.

British pipe organ builders
Inventors of musical instruments
People educated at King Edward's School, Birmingham
1876 births
1957 deaths
People from Nottingham
English musical instrument makers